Spilarctia terminicomma is a moth in the family Erebidae. It was described by Karel Černý in 2009. It is found in Thailand.

References

Moths described in 2009
terminicomma